Meierhoffer Sand Company Office Building was a historic office building located at Boonville, Cooper County, Missouri. It was built about 1900, and was a one-story, rectangular vernacular brick building with a gable roof.  An addition was constructed about 1910 which housed a wagon scale.  By 1929, the building was used as a grocery store and was later converted to a dwelling. It has apparently been demolished.

It was listed on the National Register of Historic Places in 1990.

See also 
 Meierhoffer House
 National Register of Historic Places listings in Cooper County, Missouri

References

Office buildings on the National Register of Historic Places in Missouri
Commercial buildings completed in 1900
National Register of Historic Places in Cooper County, Missouri
1900 establishments in Missouri
Demolished buildings and structures in Missouri
Boonville, Missouri
Sand mining